Jacklyn Zeman (born March 6, 1953) is an American actress. She is known for her role as Barbara "Bobbie" Spencer on General Hospital. She is sometimes credited as Jackie Zeman.

Early life and education
Zeman was born in Englewood, New Jersey, to a family of Jewish descent. Her parents are Rita Zeman-Rohlman, a magazine supervisor, and Richard S. Zeman, a systems engineer. She grew up in Bergenfield, New Jersey and completed her high school studies at age 15, at Bergenfield High School, after which she studied dance on a scholarship at New York University. She was a Playboy Bunny at the Playboy Club in 1972.

Career outside of acting
In the 1990s, Zeman was the spokeswoman for Excedrin aspirin. She currently works with the Home Shopping Network, designing and presenting a signature line of jewelry.

Personal life
Zeman has been married three times.  Her first marriage, to Murray Kaufman, a popular DJ known as Murray the K, lasted from September 16, 1979 to 1981.  Her second marriage, to Steve Gribbin, lasted from 1985 to 1986. Her third marriage, to Glenn Gorden, lasted from February 14, 1988 to June 21, 2007; Zeman and Gorden have two daughters, Cassidy Zee Gorden (born September 16, 1990) and Lacey Rose Gorden (born July 15, 1992).

Zeman was a close friend of her late GH co-star Shell Kepler (Nurse Amy Vining)'s and delivered a eulogy at her funeral.

She was also close to the late GH co-star Anna Lee (wealthy matriarch Lila Quartermaine), to whom Zeman paid tribute in 2004, prior to Lee's death. Zeman recently said in an interview, when asked if Lee had a pretty great memory: "Absolutely, she did! She was so beautiful and funny. Oh, my God, she was funny. She had a bawdy sense of humor. And of how many women, she stayed on that show for so many years, and well, well, well, with an older woman, which she was on, and still, they could shot her so tight with such beautiful close-ups, because, she had such [well, not only], a beautiful face, when she continued to having as she aged, but the beauty and the light within her, in her spirit, it just truly say, 'A Star Shines.' She is the perfect example of that!" She also responded, if Lee had been like a "surrogate grandmother" to Zeman, both on- and off- the camera: "I have great respect and admiration for Anna Lee personally and professionally. She was always a pleasure to spend time with both on and off the set. I still think of her often and I feel blessed to have experienced her friendship and her amazing sense of humor. I miss her beautiful smiling face." The last thing she said about the times that she and Lee spent together, while not doing General Hospital, like fundraisers or primarily eating out was, "Yes, and I enjoyed every minute of the time Anna Lee and I spent together. She was such fun to be around and she had the best sense of humor. Very earthy. I miss her so much but I feel such gratitude to have known her and worked with her and I will always remember her with love and friendship in my heart."

Zeman's home in Malibu, California was reported to be in foreclosure in 2012.

Filmography
 (1976–77): One Life to Live as Lana McClain (credited as Jackie Zeman)
 (1976): The Edge of Night as Bobbi
 (1977–2010, 2013–): General Hospital as Bobbie Spencer
 (1977): The Day the Music Died as Samantha as (credited as Jackie Zeman)
 (1982): National Lampoon's Class Reunion as Jane Washbur
(2017–): Misguided as Mo

Awards and nominations
Daytime Emmys nominations
Outstanding Supporting Actress (1981) for General Hospital
Outstanding Supporting Actress (1995) for General Hospital
Outstanding Supporting Actress (1997) for General Hospital
Outstanding Lead Actress (1998) for General Hospital

Soap Opera Digest Award
Favorite Villainess (1979)

Indie Series Awards nominations

 Best Supporting Actress Drama (2020) for Misguided
 Best Supporting Actress Comedy (2018) for Misguided

References

External links

1953 births
Actresses from New Jersey
American soap opera actresses
American television actresses
Living people
People from Bergenfield, New Jersey
Bergenfield High School alumni
21st-century American women